Two ships of the Royal Navy have been named HMS Harebell :

  an  sloop launched in 1918 and scrapped in 1939
 HMS Harebell, a  ordered in 1940 and cancelled in 1941

Royal Navy ship names